The Cabinet of Guillermo Lasso was formed in 2021.

Members

References 

Government of Ecuador
Cabinets established in 2021
2021 establishments in Ecuador
Current governments